Percy Hope (foaled on April 28, 1998 in Kentucky) was an American thoroughbred racehorse who won the Rushaway Stakes and the Lone Star Derby in 2001. He started in the 2001 Preakness Stakes, finishing 9th.<ref Stakes history at Turfway Park Retrieved August 23, 2018</ref>

He became the second horse since Anet in 1997 to win both the Rushaway and the Lone Star Derby.

References

1998 racehorse births
Thoroughbred family 13-c
Racehorses bred in Kentucky
Racehorses trained in the United States